The Diving competition in the 2007 Summer Universiade were held in Bangkok, Thailand.

Medal overview

Men's events

Women's events

Medal table

References

Results
 

2007 Summer Universiade
2007 in diving
Diving at the Summer Universiade